"The Love I Lost" is a song by American R&B group Harold Melvin & the Blue Notes. Originally written as a ballad by Philly soul songwriters Kenny Gamble and Leon Huff, the song was transformed into a disco song and features drummer Earl Young. It was released from the Black & Blue album in late 1973 and sold more than a million copies. In the 21st century, the track has been the subject of extended re-edits by notable remixers Tom Moulton and Dimitri From Paris.

Background
"The Love I Lost" is considered an early example of disco.
The track was one of the transitional songs marking the emergence of disco from traditional rhythm and blues as a distinctive style of music.

Charts
The song peaked at number seven on the US Billboard Hot 100 and spent two weeks at number one on the Billboard Hot Soul Singles chart. It also reached number 21 in the United Kingdom in early 1974.

Certifications

West End featuring Sybil version

On January 4, 1993, American R&B and pop singer-songwriter Sybil released a cover of "The Love I Lost" with British DJ and producer West End (a.k.a. Eddie Hordon). It was produced by Mike Stock and Pete Waterman, and received positive reviews from music critics. This version remains one of Sybil's most successful single, reaching number 18 on the US Billboard Hot Dance Club Play chart and number three in the United Kingdom, as well as number one on the UK Dance Singles Chart and the UK Club Chart. The cover also reached number nine in Ireland. Additionally, "The Love I Lost" was a top 20 hit in Finland (14) and the Netherlands (11). And it reached number nine on the Eurochart Hot 100 in October 1993. A music video was also produced to promote the single.

Critical reception
AllMusic editor Justin Kantor described the song as a "vibrant, disco-styled cover", noting further that Sybil's "high-energy delivery is soulful, spirited, and commanding". Larry Flick from Billboard wrote, "While urban-ites continue to chew on the sweet "You're the Love of My Life", popsters are served a sparkling pop/NRG rendition of a Harold Melvin & the Blue Notes classic. This timeless tune gains its current top 40 muscle by Sybil's lively and soulful vocal, and the distinct hand of producers Stock & Waterman. A top-five U.K. smash that should have little trouble making the grade here." The Gavin Report complimented the singer's "sweet, strong vocals". In his weekly UK chart commentary, James Masterton said, "A fairly faithful cover [...], the classic song, coupled with the powerful voice of Sybil makes for one of those soul covers which if anything adds to the original. Notice as well the production credits on the back of such a trendy record - Mike Stock and Pete Waterman, showing that there is life after Kylie and Jason." Alan Jones from Music Week felt that here, the 1974 hit "makes an easy transition from Philly soul to commercial garage", remarking that "its uplifting, hustling. instrumental track is strangely at odds with the downbeat lyrics, but it's tight, commercial, bright and breezy. A monster in the clubs, and likely to become an equally large pop hit." Another editor, Andy Beevers, declared it as a "very solid garage reworking". James Hamilton from the RM Dance Update complimented it as "superb".

Track listing
 CD single, UK (1993)
 "The Love I Lost" (7-inch version) – 3:27
 "The Love I Lost" (12-inch club mix) – 5:23
 "The Love I Lost" (Unrequited Mix) – 6:37
 "Sybil-It" – 3:42

Charts

Weekly charts

Year-end charts

References

External links
  Song review] on AllMusic
 

1973 singles
1973 songs
1993 singles
Harold Melvin & the Blue Notes songs
Pete Waterman Entertainment singles
Philadelphia International Records singles
Songs written by Kenny Gamble
Songs written by Leon Huff
Sybil (singer) songs
Music Week number-one dance singles